Adam James Bartlett (born 27 February 1986) is a former English footballer who played as a goalkeeper. Bartlett has played for Blyth Spartans, Kidderminster Harriers, Cambridge United, Hereford United, Gateshead, Hartlepool United, Darlington, York City and Whickham. Bartlett is currently the Head of Goalkeeping at Newcastle United.

Career

Early career
Bartlett was born in Newcastle upon Tyne, Tyne and Wear. He started his career at Newcastle United at the age of nine. Over the years, he progressed through to the reserve team, playing at every youth level. He trained with the senior team and was a standby for a UEFA Champions League match against Inter Milan in March 2003. He was also an Academy goalkeeping coach at the club. He was released, aged 19, in 2005.

Bartlett signed for Conference North club Blyth Spartans, playing the first game of his career at senior level against Wakefield & Emley on 10 September 2005. He played 14 games in his initial season, and followed this up with 47 in all competitions in 2006–07. He signed a new one-year contract in August 2007. He was named as Blyth's Player of the Season for the 2007–08 season. Bartlett's impressive performances at Blyth Spartans led to an England C call up and upon his departure from the club he was inducted into Blyth Spartans' Hall of Fame. During his final year at Blyth, he made six appearances for the England national C team.

Kidderminster Harriers and Hereford United
Bartlett signed for Conference Premier club Kidderminster Harriers on 27 May 2008 on a one-year contract. He was an ever-present in the 2008–09 Conference Premier. Bartlett joined Cambridge United on an emergency loan to play for them at Wembley Stadium in the 2009 Conference Premier play-off Final, starting as Cambridge were beaten 2–0 by Torquay United. He was named as the Conference Premier Goalkeeper of the Year for 2008–09.

On 22 June 2009, Bartlett signed for League Two club Hereford United. He helped Hereford upset League One team Charlton Athletic in the League Cup first round on 11 August 2009, in which he saved a penalty from Charlton's Andy Gray in the 62nd minute. In March 2010, he extended his Hereford contract for a further year. Bartlett was Hereford's only ever-present player in 2009–10, and was named the club's Player of the Year. In May 2011, he signed a new two-year contract with the club.

Gateshead and Hartlepool United

Bartlett signed for Conference Premier club Gateshead on 8 June 2012. He made his debut on 11 August 2012 in a 2–2 away draw with Luton Town. Bartlett started for Gateshead as they were beaten 2–1 at Wembley Stadium by Cambridge United in the 2014 Conference Premier play-off Final. At the end of 2014–15, Bartlett was released by Gateshead.

Bartlett signed for League Two club Hartlepool United on 10 July 2015. He made his debut on 8 August 2015, keeping a clean sheet in a 2–0 home victory over Morecambe. Bartlett made 15 appearances for Hartlepool in 2015–16, keeping five clean sheets. Bartlett signed a new contract with the club in April 2016. He was often back-up to Trevor Carson but regained the number-one spot in 2016–17 when an injury ruled out Carson for the rest of the season. However, he later lost his place to Middlesbrough loanee Joe Fryer.

Darlington and York City
Bartlett had his Hartlepool contract cancelled by mutual consent on 21 March 2017 to take up a full-time role as an academy goalkeeping coach at Middlesbrough and moved into part-time football, signing for National League North club Darlington the following day. He made eight appearances for Darlington in 2016–17 as they finished fifth in the table. However, Darlington were denied entry to the play-offs because their Blackwell Meadows ground did not meet seating requirements.

In October 2017, Bartlett turned down the opportunity to sign for Darlington's National League North rivals York City, as he wanted to stay part-time. York had recently appointed Martin Gray as manager, who Bartlett played under at Darlington. He eventually signed for York on 7 November 2017 for an undisclosed fee on a contract until June 2019. He left York in May 2019 to pursue a career in sales with sporting goods manufacturers Core 37 and play part-time football for Whickham of the Northern League Division One.

Coaching career
In August 2019, Bartlett began working as the goalkeeper coach for Newcastle's U23 side. He began working with the first team in January 2022, assisting head goalkeeper coach Simon Smith. On 21 October 2022, it was announced that Bartlett had been promoted to role of Newcastle's head goalkeeper coach.

Career statistics

Honours
Individual
Blyth Spartans Player of the Season: 2007–08
Conference Premier Goalkeeper of the Year: 2008–09
Hereford United Player of the Year: 2009–10

References

1986 births
Living people
Footballers from Newcastle upon Tyne
English footballers
England semi-pro international footballers
Association football goalkeepers
Newcastle United F.C. players
Blyth Spartans A.F.C. players
Kidderminster Harriers F.C. players
Cambridge United F.C. players
Hereford United F.C. players
Gateshead F.C. players
Hartlepool United F.C. players
Darlington F.C. players
York City F.C. players
Whickham F.C. players
National League (English football) players
English Football League players
Newcastle United F.C. non-playing staff
Middlesbrough F.C. non-playing staff
Association football goalkeeping coaches